Edmund J. Labuwi (born January 9, 1873, in Rubicon, Wisconsin) was a Republican member of the Wisconsin State Assembly. He was elected to the Assembly in 1916. Additionally, Labuwi was Chairman (similar to Mayor) and Town Treasurer of Rubicon, Sheriff of Dodge County, Wisconsin, as well as President (also similar to Mayor) and Supervisor of Neosho, Wisconsin.

Labuwi was convicted of obtaining money under false pretenses. He paid a fine of $1,000 and costs, amounting to $1,600.

He died on June 16, 1921, at his home in Neosho, Wisconsin.

References

People from Rubicon, Wisconsin
Mayors of places in Wisconsin
City and town treasurers in the United States
Wisconsin sheriffs
1873 births
1921 deaths
Wisconsin politicians convicted of crimes
People from Neosho, Wisconsin
Republican Party members of the Wisconsin State Assembly